Abel Iturralde is one of the twenty provinces of the Bolivian La Paz Department. It is situated in its northern part. Its name honors Abel Iturralde Palacios, a Bolivian politician. Madidi National Park is partially in this province.

Location 

Abel Iturralde province is located between 11° 48' and 14° 35' South and between 66° 55' and 69° 05' West. It extends over 300 km from North to South, and 200 km from east to west. 

The province is situated on the northern edges of the Cordillera Central. It is bordered to the west  by the Madre de Dios and Heath Rivers and to the east by the Río Beni. The province borders Pando Department in the north, Peru in the west, Franz Tamayo Province in the south, and Beni in the east.

Population 
The population of Abel Iturralde Province has increased by 100% over the recent two decades:
1992: 8,226 inhabitants (census)
2001: 11,828 inhabitants (census)
2005: 14,060 inhabitants (est.)
2010: 16,397 inhabitants (est.)
 
98.3% of the population speak Spanish, 12.1% speak Quechua, 6.7% Aymara, and 9.8% other indigenous languages. (2001)  

The literacy rate of the province's population is 83.5%. (1992) 

83.8% of the population have no access to electricity, 58.7% have no sanitary facilities. (1992)

87.0% of the population are Catholics, 10.6% are Protestants. (1992)

Division 
The province comprises two municipalities:
Ixiamas Municipality - 5,625 inhabitants (2005)
San Buenaventura Municipality - 6,203 inhabitants

References

External links 
General map of province
Detailed map of province towns and rivers
Population data (Spanish)
Social data (Spanish)

 

Provinces of La Paz Department (Bolivia)